Henry Hugh Shelton (born January 2, 1942) is a former United States Army officer who served as the 14th chairman of the Joint Chiefs of Staff from 1997 to 2001.

Early life, family and education
Shelton was born in Tarboro, North Carolina and graduated from North Edgecombe High School in 1959. Shelton attended North Carolina State University, and was a member of Pershing Rifles. He earned a Bachelor of Science degree in textile engineering in 1963 while earning his Army commission through Reserve Officers' Training Corps training. Shelton's further education includes a Master of Science degree in political science from Auburn University at Montgomery in 1973 as well as studies at the Air Command and Staff College from August 1972 to June 1973 and the National War College from June 1982 to June 1983. Shelton married Carolyn L. Johnson in 1963; the pair have three sons together.

Military service
Shelton served two tours of duty in the Vietnam War with the 5th Special Forces Group, and with the 173rd Airborne Brigade, followed by a series of command and staff assignments. Following the Gulf War, Shelton commanded the 82nd Airborne Division at Fort Bragg in his home state of North Carolina. In 1993, he was given command of XVIII Airborne Corps. Shelton led the Joint Task Force responsible for Operation Uphold Democracy in Haiti in 1994. In 1996, Shelton, a Special Forces soldier, was promoted to the rank of general and the position of Commander in Chief of United States Special Operations Command (SOCOM). He was the first Graduate of the U.S. Army Special Forces Program to command SOCOM.

Upon the retirement of John M. Shalikashvili, Shelton was appointed as Chairman of the Joint Chiefs of Staff by President Bill Clinton and Secretary of Defense William Cohen on 1 October 1997.

Shelton led the planning of the Kosovo War in 1999 during his time in office. Later he coined the phrase "Dover test", testing the support for a war based on the reaction of the people after seeing American casualties returning at the Dover Air Force Base. During the events of 11 September 2001, Shelton was flying on-board Boeing C-135 Speckled Trout, traveling to a NATO meeting in Europe, but turned back and returned to Washington. Upon entering the United States Airspace, the C-135 flew past the World Trade Center so Shelton was able to assess the situation following the attack. Already scheduled to retire in October, Shelton spent his last weeks in office coordinating military plans to destroy al-Qaeda and Taliban forces in Afghanistan and helping to develop an interagency strategy to defeat, disrupt, and degrade terrorist activities around the world. These would form the basis of Operation Enduring Freedom and the global War on Terror. Upon Shelton's end of term, President George W. Bush nominated then-Vice Chairman Air Force General Richard Myers, who was sworn in on 1 October 2001.

Post-military career
In 2002 Shelton founded the General Hugh Shelton Leadership Center at North Carolina State University. The center was created to "inspire, educate, and develop values-based leaders, both locally and globally, committed to personal integrity, professional ethics, and selfless service."

In his retirement, Shelton joined the Board of Directors of Red Hat in April 2003, and was elected that board's chairman in 2010. He also holds directorships at Anheuser Busch, Anteon International and Protective Products of America. At his alma mater of North Carolina State University, the General Hugh Shelton Leadership Center was founded in 2002, which grants scholarships to people who are committed to personal integrity, professional ethics, and selfless service.

Shelton also served as an advisor to Senator John Edwards' presidential campaign from 2003 to 2004. Shelton created a minor controversy for 2004 Democratic presidential candidate, retired U.S. Army General Wesley Clark, a subordinate of Shelton's during the 1999 Kosovo military actions, when he stated: "I will tell you the reason [Clark] came out of Europe early had to do with integrity and character issues, things that are very near and dear to my heart. I'll just say Wes won't get my vote," casting doubt upon Clark's candidacy.

On March 1, 2008, Shelton announced his endorsement of Senator Hillary Clinton for the 2008 Democratic Presidential Primary, stating, "I've been with Senator Clinton when she has been with our military men and women. I know from those experiences that she understands the demands and sacrifice of military life. I am confident she will always put the readiness and well being of our troops first. She is ready to be Commander-in-Chief." Shelton was the second Chairman of the Joint Chiefs of Staff to endorse Clinton, the first being General John Shalikashvili.

On October 12, 2010, Shelton published his autobiography, Without Hesitation: The Odyssey of an American Warrior, along with coauthors Ron Levinson and Malcolm McConnell. An excerpt tells the story of a high-ranking Clinton Cabinet member proposing that Shelton intentionally allow an American pilot to be killed by the Iraqis to have an excuse to retaliate and go to war. The book also tells of Bill Clinton's tearful confession to Shelton; a time during the Clinton administration when a close Clinton aide lost possession of the biscuit (top secret presidential nuclear launch authorization codes); details of a contentious Camp David meeting among George W. Bush and his National Security Council immediately after 9/11, where internal battle lines were drawn. His book also says there were multiple attempts to kill Osama bin Laden that were shot down by Madeleine Albright.

On 27 August 2010, a statue of Shelton was unveiled and dedicated at the Airborne Special Operations Museum in Fayetteville, NC. The statue was commissioned and donated by H. Ross Perot.

On 24 October 2010, Shelton appeared on This Week with Christiane Amanpour, on 6 December 2010, on The Daily Show with Jon Stewart, and on 30 December 2010, on The Charlie Rose Show on PBS and Bloomberg TV, to promote the publication of his memoir.

On 20 October 2012, Shelton was honored at the 6th Annual Brian & Kendra's Bluegrass Party in Speed, North Carolina. He was presented with a Distinguished Achievements plaque and a roadside display at the entrance of Speed, honoring his hometown and acknowledging his achievements.

Shelton and his wife, Carolyn, established the Hugh and Carolyn Shelton Military Neurotrauma Foundation in 2005 to fund research into traumatic brain injury among military personnel.

Dates of rank

* - Date of rank adjusted for time not spent on active duty. Receipt of officer's commission in June 1963.

Decorations and badges
Shelton's decorations and medals include:

Other Recognition
In 1998, Shelton received the Golden Plate Award of the American Academy of Achievement presented by Awards Council members General Colin L. Powell and General John M. Shalikashvili.

In 2002, Shelton received the Congressional Gold Medal. The citation says, "Throughout his 38 years of service to his country, his ascent through the ranks of the Army, two tours in Vietnam and duty in Operation Desert Storm, Gen. Shelton has carried with him the North Carolina values of service, sacrifice, love of family, faith in God and devotion to country."

In 2011, The Command and General Staff College Foundation presented retired General Hugh Shelton with the Foundation's 2011 Distinguished Leadership Award.

References

External links

 Army biography and career summary
 

1942 births
Living people
People from Tarboro, North Carolina
North Carolina State University alumni
Pershing Riflemen
United States Army Rangers
Members of the United States Army Special Forces
United States Army personnel of the Vietnam War
Recipients of the Air Medal
Recipients of the Gallantry Cross (Vietnam)
Auburn University at Montgomery alumni
Air Command and Staff College alumni
National War College alumni
Recipients of the Meritorious Service Medal (United States)
Recipients of the Legion of Merit
United States Army generals
Recipients of the Distinguished Service Medal (US Army)
Chairmen of the Joint Chiefs of Staff
Recipients of the Defense Distinguished Service Medal
Congressional Gold Medal recipients
Red Hat people
Honorary Knights Commander of the Order of the British Empire